USS Marguerite (SP-193) was a United States Navy patrol vessel in commission from 1917 to 1919.

Marguerite was built as a civilian motorboat of the same name in 1916 by the Smith-Williams Company at Salisbury, Maryland. The U.S. Navy purchased her from her owner, W. D. Sargent of Bayonne, New Jersey, on 27 June 1917 for World War I service as a patrol vessel. She was commissioned as USS Marguerite (SP-193) on 2 October 1917.

Marguerite was assigned to the 7th Naval District and served as a section patrol boat based at St. Augustine, Florida.

Marguerite was transferred to the Department of the Treasury on 11 December 1919 for use by the United States Coast Guard.

References

Department of the Navy: Navy History and Heritage Command: Online Library of Selected Images: Civilian Ships: Marguerite (Motor Boat, 1916). Served as USS Marguerite (SP-193) in 1917-19
NavSource Online: Section Patrol Craft Photo Archive: Marguerite (SP 193)

Patrol vessels of the United States Navy
World War I patrol vessels of the United States
Ships built in Salisbury, Maryland
1916 ships